Lakshman Manikya was the Maharaja of Tripura during the mid-18th-century, though he maintained little actual power, having acted only as a puppet-monarch under Shamsher Gazi.

Life
Originally named Banamali Thakur, he was a grandson of Maharaja Dharma Manikya II by his younger son Gadadhar Thakur.

In 1748, control of Tripura was taken by Shamsher Gazi, a Bengali Muslim zamindar. Facing opposition from the kingdom's citizens, Gazi placed Banamali on the throne under the name Lakshman Manikya, though actual power remained with the former. This continued for three years, though Lakshman failed to gain the support of the population. Eventually, he was dislodged by Gazi who took the throne for himself, though his rule was similarly short, with the original dynasty reclaiming the power in 1760.

His son Durga Manikya also later became ruler of Tripura, reigning from 1809 to 1813.

References

Kings of Tripura
History of Tripura